Mogh-e Qanbareh-ye Kuh Mobarak (also Romanized as Mogh-e Qanbareh-ye Kūh Mobārak; also known as Kūh-e Mobārak and Mogh-e Qanbareh) is a village in Kangan Rural District, in the Central District of Jask County, Hormozgan Province, Iran. At the 2006 census, its population was 160, in 30 families.

References 

Populated places in Jask County